Paulo Roberto Curtis Costa (born 27 January 1963 in Viamão, Brazil), known as just Paulo Roberto, is a Brazilian former professional footballer who played as a defender for clubs in Brazil and Paraguay.

Career statistics
  Grêmio 1978–1983
  São Paulo 1984
  Santos 1985
  Vasco da Gama 1986–1989
  Botafogo 1989–1991
  Cruzeiro 1992–1994
  Corinthians 1994
  Atlético Mineiro 1995–1996
  Fluminense 1996–1997
  Cerro Porteño 1998
  Canoas 1999–2000

Honours

Club
 Grêmio
 Brazilian Championship: 1981
 Copa Libertadores: 1983
 Intercontinental Cup: 1983

 Vasco da Gama
 Campeonato Carioca: 1987, 1988

 Botafogo
 Campeonato Carioca: 1990

 Cruzeiro
 Campeonato Mineiro: 1992, 1994
 Supercopa Sudamericana: 1992
 Copa do Brasil: 1993

 Atlético Mineiro
 Campeonato Mineiro: 1995

External links
 Profile at Ceroacero Profile at

1963 births
Living people
Brazilian footballers
Brazilian expatriate footballers
Brazil under-20 international footballers
Brazil international footballers
1983 Copa América players
Grêmio Foot-Ball Porto Alegrense players
São Paulo FC players
Santos FC players
CR Vasco da Gama players
Botafogo de Futebol e Regatas players
Cruzeiro Esporte Clube players
Sport Club Corinthians Paulista players
Fluminense FC players
Clube Atlético Mineiro players
Cerro Porteño players
Copa Libertadores-winning players
Expatriate footballers in Paraguay

Association football defenders